PHB may refer to:

Science and technology
 Per-hop behaviour, in the DiffServ world
 Polyhydroxybutyrate, a biopolymer
 Prohibitin, a human gene

Transportation
 Pedestrian hybrid beacon, a type of traffic signal
 Parnaíba-Prefeito Dr. João Silva Filho International Airport (IATA code), Brazil
 Phoebus Apollo Aviation (ICAO code), a small airline in South Africa

Organisations
 Peterhouse Boys' School, a private boys' high school in Zimbabwe
 Platinum Habib Bank (Bank PHB), a commercial bank in Nigeria, a member of the Bank PHB Group

Other uses
 Personal health budgets, a stated funded healthcare package
 Bachelor of Philosophy (PhB), a degree
 Pointy-haired boss, a character from the Dilbert cartoons
 Player's Handbook, a rulebook for role-playing game Dungeons & Dragons
 PHB (bicycle), a hydrogen bicycle
 Pig Heart Boy, a children's book by Malorie Blackman, made into a television show